Miles Davis with Sonny Rollins (PRLP 187) is a 1954 10 inch LP album by Miles Davis, released by Prestige Records.  The four tracks on this LP, along with a second take of "But Not For Me", were recorded at Rudy Van Gelder's Studio, Hackensack, New Jersey, on June 29, 1954.

The album showcases the musical and compositional abilities of Sonny Rollins, who was Davis' favoured saxophonist at this point in his career. Three of the four tunes were Sonny Rollins originals, and would go on to become regular parts of both Davis' and Rollins' live sets. In his autobiography, Davis says that Rollins was writing the music on scraps of paper in the studio during the recording session. Davis also states the cover of Gershwin's "But Not for Me" was an early example of himself being influenced by the spacing and lyricism of the pianist Ahmad Jamal.

After the 10" LP format was discontinued, all four tracks, along with the alternate take, were included on side 2 of the 12" album Bags' Groove (PRLP 7109).

Track listing

Personnel
 Miles Davis – Trumpet
 Sonny Rollins – Tenor Saxophone
 Horace Silver – Piano
 Percy Heath – Bass
 Kenny Clarke – Drums

References

1954 albums
Miles Davis albums
Prestige Records albums
Albums recorded at Van Gelder Studio
Albums produced by Bob Weinstock